Yousaf Borahil al-Mismari (ca. 1866 — 19 December 1931) was a well known Libyan Muslim resistance leader fighting against Italian colonization and deputy leader of the Libyan Jihad after the death of Omar Al-Mokhtar. He was killed in a confrontation with Italian security forces in Libya at the age of 65.

References

1866 births
1931 deaths
Libyan people of Arab descent
Executed Libyan people
Executed revolutionaries
Guerrilla warfare theorists
Italian Libya
Libyan educators
Libyan Muslims
Libyan rebels
Libyan resistance leaders
Libyan revolutionaries
People executed by Italy by hanging